Nephelistis is a genus of moths of the family Noctuidae.

Species
 Nephelistis congenitalis Hampson, 1905
 Nephelistis differens (Druce, 1889)

References
Natural History Museum Lepidoptera genus database
Nephelistis at funet

Hadeninae